The Marine Insurance Act 1745 (19 Geo. 2 c.37) was an Act of Parliament of the Parliament of Great Britain.  The Act has been described as "the first significant statutory intervention in substantive marine insurance law".

Background

The purpose of the Act was to put an end to the practice of wagering disguised as insurance upon marine vessels.  Persons who had no commercial interest in a marine cargo would take out a policy of insurance in the marine form, essentially gambling upon whether or not the ship would safely arrive at its destination.  Concern was expressed that, apart from general policies against gambling, this also created a positive incentive for certain parties to overload ships and ensure that they were dispatched in risky condition.

Accordingly, the Act introduced into English law for the first time the requirement of an "insurable interest" in the subject matter of a policy of insurance.  This requirement was later replicated for life insurance in the Life Assurance Act 1774.  Neither statute sought to define an insurable interest, and it was not until the decision of the courts in Lucena v Craufurd in 1806 that an insurable interest was first defined as "A right in the property, or a right derivable out of some contract about the property, which in either case may be lost upon some contingency affecting the possession or enjoyment of the party."

Text

The Act is relatively short.  The text of its first section (including the preamble) is set out below:

Repeal

The Act remained substantively in force until it was incorporated into the Marine Insurance Act 1906.

References

External links

Great Britain Acts of Parliament 1745
Insurance legislation
History of insurance